The Kahama Airstrip is an airstrip operated by Buzwagi Gold Mine. The airport is located in Kahama in the Shinyanga Region. The airport is currently used for mine operations and is used by charter companies, however, Precision Air plans to begin scheduled service to Kahama soon.

References

Airstrips in Tanzania
Buildings and structures in the Lindi Region